Snyder Mill is a historic grist mill located on Monocacy Creek in Exeter Township, Berks County, Pennsylvania.  The mill was built about 1780, and is a 1 1/2-story, banked stone building.  It measures 26 feet by 50 feet, with a frame addition of 20 feet, 3 inches, by 25 feet 10 inches.  It retains a wooden water wheel. The mill ceased operations in 1930.

It was listed on the National Register of Historic Places in 1990.

Gallery

References

Grinding mills in Berks County, Pennsylvania
Grinding mills on the National Register of Historic Places in Pennsylvania
Industrial buildings completed in 1780
National Register of Historic Places in Berks County, Pennsylvania